Olimpiu Bucur (born 1 April 1989) is a Romanian footballer who plays as a midfielder for CS Florești.

References

External links
 

1989 births
Living people
Romanian footballers
Association football forwards
CS Pandurii Târgu Jiu players
CSU Voința Sibiu players
ACF Gloria Bistrița players
AFC Dacia Unirea Brăila players
Liga I players
Liga II players
People from Cluj County